Fischbein, Fishbein or Fishbine ("baleen") are German surnames. Notable people with the surname include:

Fischbein
 Eric Fischbein (born 1976), Jewish Swedish football midfielder

Fishbein 
 Alexander Fishbein (born 1968), chess player
 Anne Fishbein (born 1958), American photographer
 Harry Fishbein (1896-1976), American bridge player
 Jonathan Fishbein, American physician
 Martin Fishbein (1936-2009), American social psychologist
 Morris Fishbein (1889-1976), physician
 Moysey Fishbein, journalist at the Ukrainian diaspora magazine "Suchasnist" ("Our times")
 Susie Fishbein (born 1968), Orthodox Jewish kosher cookbook author

See also 
 Fishbein convention
 Fishbein House
 Fishbein Trophy

German-language surnames
Jewish surnames
Yiddish-language surnames